Patricia "Tricia" Byrnes (born November 18, 1974) is an American snowboarder, born in Greenwich, Connecticut. Her achievements in the FIS Snowboard World Cup include fifteen victories in halfpipe between 1997 and 2003 (also 2 second places and 3 third places), more than any other women as of 2019. She competed in women's halfpipe at the 2002 Winter Olympics in Salt Lake City, placing 6th in the final.

References

External links

1974 births
Living people
American female snowboarders
Sportspeople from Greenwich, Connecticut
Olympic snowboarders of the United States
Snowboarders at the 2002 Winter Olympics
21st-century American women